Cordon sanitaire is French for "sanitary cordon". It may refer to:
Cordon sanitaire (medicine), a cordon that quarantines an area during an infectious disease outbreak
Cordon sanitaire (politics), refusal to cooperate with certain political parties
Cordon sanitaire (international relations), a French foreign policy of containing Soviet and German influence in interwar Europe
Externalization (migration), specifically efforts to enlist third countries to prevent asylum seekers from arriving at a border